Colombo International Financial City  is a special economic zone and International Financial Centre located in Colombo, Sri Lanka, which is currently under construction on reclaimed land adjacent to the Galle Face Green. The land reclamation work had been completed as of January 2018. In 2017, the cost was slated to be US$ 15 billion. The project is part of China's Belt and Road initiative.

In May 2021, Parliament of Sri Lanka approved Port City Commission Bill to establish the Colombo Port City Special Economic Zone and Economic Commission. Under this law, companies can be exempt from all taxes, personal, corporate, excise, import, and every other tax for 40 years.

Geography

The finance city is to be constructed between the southern edge of the new Colombo South Port and the Fort Lighthouse.

Background

The Port City 
The Port City was claimed to be a concept of former President Mahinda Rajapaksa, who was apparently inspired while inspecting the landfill being constructed for the Colombo South port. The modern Port City was in fact a fully solicited proposal submitted by China Harbour Engineering Company based on previous proposals.

The construction was set to begin in March 2011 but due to several circumstances the project was stopped. In mid 2012, the Sri Lankan Ports Authority (SLPA) announced that the construction of the then Colombo Port City project would commence on 17 September 2014. The budget was estimated to be $15 billion.

The reclamation was to be carried out by China Harbor Engineering Corporation, who has been engaged by the investor.  was the land was given to government as well as  while owned by the government was planned to be leased for 99 years to the Chinese company.  was planned to be given freehold to the Chinese company.

Construction of the Colombo Port City project was launched on 17 September 2014 by Former Sri Lankan President Mahinda Rajapaksa and General Secretary of the Chinese Communist Party Xi Jinping.

The port city has been criticised for several reasons. Many environmentalists claim that the port city contains many environmental hazards and the adverse environmental impact of the project would be far greater than the economic benefits it may have to offer. The EIA report and the mitigation measures implemented by the project developers were subject to review and approval by Sri Lanka's Central Environmental Authority (CEA).  Maritime sector veterans also pointed out the dangers Sri Lanka may face due to giving outright ownership of land to China, especially in a high-security zone, and concerns about its effects on Sri Lanka's sovereignty have also been expressed. The project was also criticized for its lack of transparency and irregularities such as the involvement of SLPA which is implementing the reclamation project, had no mandate to do so as its mandate is to deal with ports and shipping.

The Colombo International Financial Centre 

The port city was suspended after the fall of the Rajapaksa government due to issues related to sovereignty of Sri Lanka and adverse environmental impacts.

 The Colombo International Financial Centre will be governed by an independent authority and will not be subjected to the Colombo Municipal Council. A special legal framework would enable it to operate on a subset of commercial law, in terms of contracts and commercial transactions with its own Special Colombo oFinancial Court serving as the court of first instance and provision of appeal to the Supreme Court of Sri Lanka. It would have its own arbitration centres.

The building complex was approved for construction in December 2018. The city will use construction resources from the Colombo Harbour Expansion Project, currently under construction near the site of this proposed city.

Construction 
The inauguration of the project was in 2014 with a revised plan inaugurated in October 2019. It is projected that the water reclamation would be completed in around twenty-eight months. In 2017, it was predicted that the city would be completed by 2041.

Land reclamation 
The port city would require around 269 hectares of reclaimed land. 116 hectares is owned by the China Communications Construction Company (CCCC), itself owned by the China Harbor Engineering Company (CHEC), and the Government of Sri Lanka has set aside another 91 hectares for public spaces.

At a question and answer section in July 2018, the Prime Minister stated that the land reclamation would be finished within one year and that construction should begin by next year, and that the government seeking assistance in establishing the legal construct for the administrative area. This was successfully completed in January 2019 according to the Ministry of Megapolis and Western Development.

The project was around three months ahead of its targeted completion as of January 2019.

Basic infrastructure 
China Daily reported in April 2019 that the hydrostructural construction would be complete by the middle of 2019, with the construction of municipal facilities being completed by July 2020.

The Road Development Authority had sent approval for the new road network and piling work had begun for the nine bridged by January 2019.

Investments 
In December 2020, Sri Lankan conglomerate LOLC Holdings signed an agreement with China Harbour Engineering for a mixed development project, with the investment value totalling $1 billion. The project includes residential, commercial and retail assets set to break ground in mid-2021. This is the first major investment in Colombo Port City.

Criticism
Tax regime of Port City has raised concerns for money laundering. The opposition MP have accused China has "taken over as much as everything in the Port City."

Gallery

See also
 Sambodhi Chaithya

References

External links

Economy of Colombo
Proposed populated places
Offshore finance
Finance in Sri Lanka
Land reclamation